Market Street Bridge (Clearfield, PA) is a bridge in the borough of Clearfield, Pennsylvania. It connects East Market Street and West Market Street. The bridge crosses over the West Branch Susquehanna River, and is one of three bridges that crosses over the river in the town.
Two bridges are intended for use by pedestrians and vehicular traffic. The third and finale bridge connects Plymptonville and Eastend neighborhoods. This bridge is strictly used for railway/freight train/locomotive. Not to be used by either vehicular or pedestrian traffic.
"No Trespassing" signs located on either side. Train bridge is owned, operated, & maintained by R.J. Coreman Railways.

History

The bridge was built in 1938 by on-site contractor Clyde Thomson of Bethlehem Steel of Bethlehem, Pennsylvania.  The steel for the structure came from the Pittsburgh-Des Moines Steel Company of Pittsburgh, Pennsylvania and Des Moines, Iowa.  The bridge was rehabilitated in 1994.

References

Bridges completed in 1938
Transportation buildings and structures in Clearfield County, Pennsylvania
Bridges over the Susquehanna River
Road bridges in Pennsylvania
Truss bridges in the United States
Steel bridges in the United States